Longhua District is a district in Shenzhen, Guangdong, People's Republic of China. It was created as a new district on 30 December 2011, and became a formal district on 11 October 2016.

History
Longhua was established as a new district on 30 December 2011 by the Shenzhen municipal government, being separated from Bao'an District. It was one of the four "new districts" established within Shenzhen (Longhua New District, Guangming New District, Pingshan New District and Dapeng New District), due to the rapid expansion of city urban area after the 2000s. It was still part of Bao'an District in administrative management. On 11 October 2016, Longhua was officially separated from Bao'an District and became a formal district on its own.

Subdistricts

Geography
By the end of 2012, Longhua District covered an area of 175.58 square kilometres. The new district is situated in the north part of Shenzhen city, and lying on the middle vertical main axis of the city, being just north of the Futian CBD, Shenzhen. It borders Dongguan City to the north.

Economy
Longhua District is one of the main production bases in Shenzhen. It consists of manufacturing industry, trading industries and information technology. Altogether forms an outward economic structure which is typical in Shenzhen Special Economic Zone.

Transportation
Longhua is considered as a transportation hub within the city. It houses the Shenzhen North Railway Station, a high-speed railway station. Both the Guangzhou–Shenzhen–Hong Kong Express Rail Link, which connects Beijing and Hong Kong (Kowloon), and the Xiamen–Shenzhen railway, runs through the station.

Shenzhen Metro
Longhua is currently served by three metro lines and two light rail lines operated by Shenzhen Metro. These lines and their stations and connections are:

   - Minle, Baishilong, Shenzhen North  , Hongshan , Shangtang, Longsheng, Longhua, Qinghu
   - Shenzhen North  , Minzhi
   - Meilinguan, Shenzhen North  , Hongshan , Shangfen, Yuanfen, Yangtai Mountain East

  Tram Line 1 - Qinghu , Qinglong, Qinglong School, Meilong North, Bilan, Wenlan, Dahe, Century Pl, Jinli, Hexi, Guancheng, Dabutou, Hedong, Shijiaotou, Xialan 
  Tram Line 2 - Qinghu , Qinglong, Qinglong School, Meilong North, Bilan, Wenlan, Dahe, Dongan, HTIP West, HTIP, HTIP East, Xiawei

Property Development
A large part of Longhua District has also been heavily developed into a high end residential area, with recent property developments established on a mostly undeveloped land surrounding the Shenzhen North Railway Station. Parts of the old industrial areas in the district are also planned to be demolished and restructured into more residential area to cope with the rapid expansion of population in the district.

List of Private housing estates in Longhua

Longhua is an area with a high density of Private housing estates. Some of the larger private housing estates in Longhua are:
 Lvjing 1866 - built by China LVGEM  Property Holdings Limited (HKEX:0095)
 Lvjing Xiangsong - built by China LVGEM  Property Holdings Limited (HKEX:0095)
 Shuixiechuntian - built by Top Spring International Holdings Limited (HKEX:3688)

Education

 Municipal schools operated by the Shenzhen Government
 Shenzhen Senior High School North Campus (北校区)
 Shenzhen Second Foreign Languages School (深圳第二外国语学校) - Dashuikeng Community, Guanlan Subdistrict

 International schools
 Merchiston International School, a British international school, is in Longhua District.
 Bromsgrove School Mission Hills, a British international school, is in Longhua District.

Attractions
Two provincial parks are located in Longhua District: Guanlan Renmin Park and Longhua Park.

See also
Guangdong
Shenzhen

References

External links

Longhua District official government website 
Longhua District official government website 
iLonghua 

 
Districts of Shenzhen